PGM-17 may refer to:

PGM-17 Thor, the first operational ballistic missile in the US arsenal.
USS PGM-17, a US Navy gunboat during World War 2.